Brookville is a town in Brookville Township, Franklin County, Indiana, United States. The population was 2,596 at the 2010 census. The town is the county seat of and the largest community entirely within Franklin County.

History
Brookville was platted in 1808 by Thomas Manwarring. The town derives its name from Brooks, the maiden name of a settler's mother. A post office has been in operation at Brookville since 1816.

The Brookville Historic District, Franklin County Seminary, The Hermitage, and Whitewater Canal Historic District are listed on the National Register of Historic Places.

Geography
Brookville is located at  (39.422328, -85.009509). It contains the confluence of the East and West forks of the Whitewater River; the East Fork forms a portion of the eastern boundary of the town.  Brookville is also at the southern end of Brookville Lake, impounded in 1974 by the United States Army Corps of Engineers.

Climate
The climate in this area is characterized by hot, humid summers and generally mild to cool winters.  According to the Köppen Climate Classification system, Brookville has a humid subtropical climate, abbreviated "Cfa" on climate maps.

Demographics

2010 census
As of the census of 2010, there were 2,596 people, 1,160 households, and 673 families living in the town. The racial makeup of the town was 97.5% White, 0.3% African American, 0.3% Native American, 0.2% Asian, 0.8% from other races, and 0.9% from two or more races. Hispanic or Latino of any race were 1.6% of the population.

There were 1,160 households, of which 29.2% had children under the age of 18 living with them, 39.4% were married couples living together, 12.7% had a female householder with no husband present, 5.9% had a male householder with no wife present, and 42.0% were non-families. 37.8% of all households were made up of individuals, and 20.7% had someone living alone who was 65 years of age or older. The average household size was 2.24 and the average family size was 2.91.

The median age in the town was 39.6 years. 24.1% of residents were under the age of 18; 9.2% were between the ages of 18 and 24; 22.4% were from 25 to 44; 24% were from 45 to 64; and 20.2% were 65 years of age or older. The gender makeup of the town was 46.8% male and 53.2% female.

2000 census
As of the census of 2000, there were 2,652 people, 1,145 households, and 683 families living in the town. There were 1,276 housing units at an average density of 953.8/mi2 (367.7/km). The racial makeup of the town was 98.91% White, 0.04% African American, 0.19% Native American, 0.34% Asian, 0.19% from other races, and 0.34% from two or more races. Hispanic or Latino of any race were 0.53% of the population.

There were 1,145 households, out of which 26.3% had children under the age of 18 living with them, 43.8% were married couples living together, 12.2% had a female householder with no husband present, and 40.3% were non-families. 36.5% of all households were made up of individuals, and 21.0% had someone living alone who was 65 years of age or older. The average household size was 2.24 and the average family size was 2.93.

In the town, the population was spread out, with 23.5% under the age of 18, 8.3% from 18 to 24, 26.7% from 25 to 44, 19.8% from 45 to 64, and 21.6% who were 65 years of age or older. The median age was 39 years. For every 100 females, there were 85.1 males. For every 100 females age 18 and over, there were 84.7 males.

The median income for a household in the town was $29,390, and the median income for a family was $37,212. Males had a median income of $29,009 versus $23,910 for females. The per capita income for the town was $17,360. About 4.4% of families and 8.0% of the population were below the poverty line, including 6.6% of those under age 18 and 8.6% of those age 65 or over.

Transportation
The main mode of transportation is by road. Major routes running through the town include:
  U.S. Route 52
  State Road 1
  State Road 101
  State Road 252

Brookville Reservoir is registered with the Federal Aviation Administration and the International Civil Aviation Organization as a civil airport assigned ICAO code K12I.  It is only suitable for aircraft capable of water landing because there are no paved runways.  Brookville Reservoir Airport is owned by the Indiana Department of Natural Resources.

Education
The town has a free lending library, the Franklin County Public Library District.

Notable people
 Anna Farquhar Bergengren (1865–?), writer, editor
 Indiana Sopris Cushman (1839-1925), pioneer teacher in Denver, Colorado
 James B. Goudie Jr., Indiana state representative, grist mill owner, and newspaper owner
 Sarah Carmichael Harrell (1844-1929), educator and temperance reformer
 John Templeton McCarty, one of the founders of the fraternity of Phi Gamma Delta
 Minnie Myrtle Miller (1842-1882), writer
 Noah Noble, 5th Governor of Indiana
 James B. Ray, 4th governor of Indiana
 John St. John, 8th governor of Kansas
 Stephen Stevens, Justice of the Indiana Supreme Court, abolitionist
 Gilbert Van Camp, founder of the Van Camp pork and beans company
 David Wallace, 6th governor of Indiana
 Lew Wallace, 11th governor of New Mexico Territory, Union general in the American Civil War, author of Ben-Hur: A Tale of the Christ
 H. B. Wilkinson, Arizona state senator
 Roswell Winans, Medal of Honor recipient
 Alex Smith, Indiana First Mr. Football

See also
 Whitewater Canal

References

External links
 

Towns in Franklin County, Indiana
Towns in Indiana
County seats in Indiana